Michael A. Thomson is a Canadian lawyer. Formerly a partner with the law firm of Tapper Cuddy LLP in Winnipeg, Manitoba, he was appointed as a judge of the Family Division of the Court of King's Bench of Manitoba on June 1, 2007.  He replaced Robert Carr, who elected to become a supernumerary judge.

Thomson received a Bachelor of Laws in 1984 and a Bachelor of Arts in 1981, both from the University of Manitoba.  He was admitted to the bar of Manitoba in 1986.  He went on to practice with the firm of Tapper Cuddy LLP for more than 20 years, in the areas of civil litigation, child protection, employment and labour, and administrative law, and acted as general counsel to various professional bodies, Indigenous organizations and child welfare agencies.

Thomson has been involved with the Committee for Consideration of Establishment of a Mental Health Court and was the President of the Schizophrenia Society of Canada.  He has acted as a Board Member of the Manitoba Japanese Canadian Cultural Centre, as pro bono counsel for the National Association of Japanese Canadians and as a volunteer minor hockey and minor soccer coach in Winnipeg.

References
 Government of Canada News Release (accessed July 30, 2007)

Judges in Manitoba
Living people
University of Manitoba alumni
Year of birth missing (living people)